Nancy Sleeth is a Christian environmentalist, author, and Managing Director of the non-profit Blessed Earth.  Her works include Go Green, Save Green: A Simple Guide to Saving Time, Money, and God’s Green Earth (Tyndale, 2009) and Almost Amish: One Woman’s Quest for a Slower, Simpler, More Sustainable Life (Tyndale, 2012). Nancy is married to Matthew Sleeth and has two children.

References

Bibliography

American environmentalists
American women environmentalists
Living people
Year of birth missing (living people)
21st-century American women